The High Strung is an American rock band from Detroit, Michigan, United States. The band is composed of lead singers and guitarists Josh Malerman and Mark Owen, guitarist Stephen Palmer, bassist Chad Stocker, and drummer Derek Berk. Malerman, Berk, and Owen attended Michigan State University in the late 1990s before moving to New York City. The band formed in Williamsburg, Brooklyn, when the members of the former East Lansing, Michigan, band The Masons changed their name and added Stocker to the roster. Owen left the band in 2005 and returned in  2016. Palmer joined the group shortly after the recording of Dragon Dicks in early 2010.

These are Good Times, Moxie Bravo, Get the Guests, ¿Posible o' Imposible? and Quiet Riots were produced in Detroit by producer/engineer Jim Diamond.

Discography
 2000 - As/Is
 2001 - Soap
 2002 - Sure as Hell
 2003 - These are Good Times
 2003 - Follow Through on Your Backhand
 2006 - Moxie Bravo
 2007 - Get the Guests
 2008 - CreEPy
 2009 - Ode to the Inverse of the Dude
 2010 - Live at Guantanamo Bay, Cuba 
 2010 - Dragon Dicks
 2011 - Clown Car
 2012 - ¿Posible o' Imposible?
 2014 - I, Anybody
 2019 - Quiet Riots
 2022 - Hannah (or The Whale)
 2023 - Address Unknown

In popular culture
While touring in 2004, they left their broken down tour bus on the steps of the Rock and Roll Hall of Fame in Cleveland, Ohio. The bus was adorned with a makeshift plaque reading, in part: "This is a 1988 Chevy G30 used by The High Strung. Although the odometer reads 8,621 miles, it is actually 318,621 miles." 
 In 2005, they began touring libraries throughout the state of Michigan, spurring an August 4, 2005, episode of This American Life on Chicago Public Radio titled "Dewey Decibel System". 
 The High Strung were featured in an interview the indie music magazine, Daytrotter in September 2006 in an article titled "The High Strung: A Tattered Atlas for a Co-Pilot and a Friend in Uncle Bob" about their ever-working ways, and relationship with Robert Pollard.
  The High Strung were featured in an article in Time Out New York in June 2007.
 Their song "The Luck You Got" from the album Moxie Bravo is featured as the theme song to the US version of the show Shameless.

References

External links
 
 Rock & Roll Library Tour website
 https://thehighstrungmusic.com/ Official Website

Garage rock groups from Michigan
Musical groups from Detroit
Musical groups established in 2000
2000 establishments in Michigan